The Kirkuk Citadel is in the centre of Kirkuk, Iraq, and is considered to be the oldest part of the city. The citadel stands on an artificial mound 130 feet high located on a plateau across the Khasa River.

History 
The origins of the citadel are disputed; some historians believe the oldest parts of the structure were built by the nomadic Gutian people around 3,500 years ago, others assert that the citadel was constructed by the Assyrian king Ashur Nasirpal II between 850 and 884 BC.

King Seleucus I Nicator built a strong rampart with 72 towers around the 72 streets and the two entries to the citadel. A jewel of the citadel is the so-called "Red Church", with traces of mosaics dating to the period before the Islamic conquest of Iraq in the 7th century. It is believed that Timur visited the citadel in 1393 during his military expedition. The modern walls go back to the Ottoman period.

In the 1990s, Saddam Hussein, announced a campaign to beautify the walled citadel. A large number of historical and religious sites still exist there, including a monument believed to be the Tomb of Daniel.

References

Castles in Iraq
Citadel